The 2016 Mid-American Conference women's soccer tournament is the postseason women's soccer tournament for the Mid-American Conference to be held from October 30 to 6, 2016. The seven-match tournament will be held at campus sites, before moving to Dix Stadium in Kent, Ohio for the semifinals and final. The eight team single-elimination tournament will consist of three rounds based on seeding from regular season conference play. The Western Michigan Broncos are the defending tournament champions after defeating the Miami RedHawks in the championship match.

Bracket

Schedule

Quarterfinals

Semifinals

Final

References 

Mid-American Conference Women's Soccer Tournament
2016 Mid-American Conference women's soccer season